St. Martin de Porres Hospital is a 300 bedded multi-specialty hospital in Kannur, Kerala, India.

References

Hospitals in Kerala
Year of establishment missing
Kannur